Aegilops ventricosa (syn. Gastropyrum ventricosum (Tausch) Á.Löve, Triticum ventricosum (Tausch) Ces.) is a plant species in the family Poaceae.

References

External links
Wheat Genetics Resource Center: Aegilops ventricosa

ventricosa